Kozluca is a village in Burdur District of Burdur Province, Turkey. Its population is 1,042 (2021). Before the 2013 reorganisation, it was a town (belde).

History
The area around Kozluca was populated during the Roman Empire era. According to mayor's page the epigraph on a pedestal around the town reads  the Roman Emperor honoured the governor of the town by a sculpture . Towards the end of Seljukids, the settlement was founded by Mahmut Bey of Hamidoğlu beylik (principality). Later during Ottoman Empire era, the efforts of a local leader named Gozulcalıoğlu helped to flourish the settlement and the settlement was named after him. In 1968, the settlement was declared a seat of township.

Economy
Main economic activity is cattle breeding and dairying. Daily milk production is about 12 tons. The agricultural crops are mostly fodder plants.

References

Villages in Burdur District